The Worlds of Doctor Who is a compilation CD consisting of musical excerpts from Doctor Who episode soundtracks, coupled with music from some of the independent spin-off productions for Reeltime Pictures, some original music and several versions of the Doctor Who theme. Most tracks (which included a mixture of original soundtrack recordings and newer performances) had been previously issued, with three tracks being released for the first time: Mark Ayres' main title music to the documentary Return to Devil's End, and two arrangements of the Doctor Who theme by Mark Lambert and Ian Hu, the second of which includes a guest performance (on the musical spoons) by Sylvester McCoy. The original theme arrangements by Delia Derbyshire and Peter Howell are also included.

The liner notes are by Gary Russell. The album was compiled and edited by Mark Ayres.

Track listing

Suite edited by Mark Ayres from his own soundtrack release

Edited by Mark Ayres from the original suite

References

Music based on Doctor Who
Doctor Who soundtracks
Soundtrack compilation albums
1994 soundtrack albums
1994 compilation albums
Silva Screen Records compilation albums
Silva Screen Records soundtracks